Ho Central is one of the constituencies represented in the Parliament of Ghana. It elects one Member of Parliament (MP) by the first past the post system of election. Ho Central is located in the Ho Municipal district of the Volta Region of Ghana.

Boundaries
The seat is located entirely within the Ho Municipal district of the Volta Region of Ghana.

Members of Parliament

Elections

See also
 List of Ghana Parliament constituencies

References 

 Adam Carr's Election Archives
 Ghana Home Page

Parliamentary constituencies in the Volta Region